Miguel Ángel Vázquez García (born 7 February 2004) is a Mexican professional footballer who plays as a centre-back for Liga MX club América.

Career statistics

Club

References

External links
 
 
 

Living people
2004 births
Mexican footballers
Association football defenders
Club América footballers
Liga MX players
Footballers from Querétaro
Sportspeople from Querétaro City